The Grand Lodge of Pennsylvania, officially  The Right Worshipful Grand Lodge of the Most Ancient and Honorable Fraternity of Free and Accepted Masons of Pennsylvania and Masonic Jurisdictions Thereunto Belonging, is the premier masonic organization in the Commonwealth of Pennsylvania. The Grand Lodge claims to be the oldest in the United States, and the third oldest in the world after England (est. 1717) and Ireland (est. 1725), having been originally established as the Provincial Grand Lodge of Pennsylvania in 1731. This claim is disputed by both the Grand Lodge of Massachusetts and the Grand Lodge of Virginia.

Today, the Grand Lodge of Pennsylvania is the largest Masonic Jurisdiction in the United States, claiming more than 86,000 members at the end of 2020. There are more Freemasons in Pennsylvania than any other State.

History

The Provincial Grand Lodge of Pennsylvania

Two English grand lodges erected lodges in Pennsylvania during the 18th century, the Premier Grand Lodge of England (known as the "Moderns"), established in London in 1717, and the Ancient Grand Lodge of England (known as the "Antients" or "Ancients"), established in London in 1751. The first of these, the Moderns' Grand Lodge, was first to establish lodges and provincial grand lodges in the American colonies. But by 1785, the Moderns and their lodges had ceased to exist in Pennsylvania, the last of their members having been absorbed by the lodges of the Ancients. The present day Grand Lodge of Pennsylvania descends primarily from the Ancients, with the Moderns having been grafted onto "Ancient York Masonry."

The Tun Tavern Lodge
The earliest minute book of any Masonic lodge on the North American continent is that for Tun Tavern Lodge No. 3 (of the Moderns) in Philadelphia. The Tun Tavern was the first "brew house" in the city, being built in 1685, and was located on the waterfront at the corner of Water Street and Tun Alley. The extant records of the Lodge begin on 24 June 1731, but the lodge may have been older than that. It was reported by Benjamin Franklin, in his Gazette for 8 December 1730, that there were "several Lodges of Free Masons erected in this Province...." The Tun Tavern, being a popular meeting place in Philadelphia, was undoubtedly the first location of a lodge in Philadelphia. Other organizations were formed there, including the St. George's Society in 1720, and the St. Andrew's Society in 1747. Even the United States Marine Corps was founded there on 10 November 1775 by Samuel Nicholas, grandson of a member of the Tun Tavern Lodge. According to Henry Coil, a Freemason from Massachusetts, the Tun Tavern Lodge was never warranted nor issued a charter, being an "immemorial rights lodge." However, the Librarian of the Masonic Library in Philadelphia believes that, simply because there is no existing evidence, there is no reason to assume that the Tun Tavern Lodge was never warranted since all of the other Lodges at the time had been, and that it must have been warranted prior to 1749 since the Grand Lodge of Pennsylvania has in its archives the minute books for the Tun Tavern Lodge from 1749-1755.

The First Provincial Grand Master
The first official act of the Moderns' Grand Lodge regarding the American colonies was the creation of a Provincial Grand Master for New York, New Jersey, and Pennsylvania, naming one Daniel Coxe, Esq., to that office. This deputation, issued on 5 June 1730, was made by the Grand Master, the Duke of Norfolk, and was to remain in effect for two years from 24 June 1731 to 24 June 1733, at which time, according to the deputation, the members were empowered to elect a Provincial Grand Master. From a letter in the possession of the New York Historical Society dated 31 July 1730 at Trenton we know that Daniel Coxe was already in the colonies. Coxe returned to England to attend a meeting of the Grand Lodge in London on 29 January 1731 where he was toasted as the Provincial Grand Master "of North America." Coxe eventually relocated in Burlington, New Jersey, about 20 miles from Philadelphia, where he had been awarded a colonial judgeship.

There are no explicit records to show that Daniel Coxe ever organized a Provincial Grand Lodge, nor to have erected any lodges, nor ever exercised his authority in any way as Provincial Grand Master prior to his death on 25 April 1739. In fact, his death, which was reported in the Pennsylvania Gazette by Benjamin Franklin, a member of The Tun Tavern Lodge in Philadelphia, does not even mention that Coxe was a Freemason, possibly indicating that Franklin and the other members of the Craft in Philadelphia were unaware of his affiliation. However, the Masonic historian Dr. Wilhelm Begeman points out that, "those who deny Coxe's activity must naturally assume the Provincial Grand Lodge established itself through its own power, which is much less probable than the legal action of Coxe... that his home was in Trenton, was no serious obstacle, for the London Grand Masters nearly all lived at a distance from London, Lord Kingston, for instance, in Ireland." An entry in "Liber B," the oldest known record of a lodge in the Americas (the second record book of St. John's Lodge, Philadelphia, from 1731 to 1738), lists William Allen as Grand Master on 24 June 1731. Coxe's deputation clearly allows for the election of a successor in perpetuity.

Provincial Grand Masters of Pennsylvania
After his election in 1731, William Allen appointed William Pringle, Deputy Grand Master, and Thomas Boude and Benjamin Franklin, Wardens. Benjamin Franklin would become Provincial Grand Master in 1734—the same year he published Anderson's Constitutions, the first Masonic book printed in America—and again in 1749. The organization of the Provincial Grand Lodge of Pennsylvania was recorded in both "Liber B" and the Pennsylvania Gazette, which published the names of the sixteen Grand Masters who served from 1731 to 1755. William Allen was Provincial Grand Master eight times. No reports were sent from the Provincial Grand Lodge of Moderns to the Grand Lodge of England, nor were any requested; being independent it apparently had no need to do so.  Yet, the Provincial Grand Lodge of Pennsylvania affiliated itself with the Grand Lodge of England in that it approved and adopted those Ritual changes made by the GLE after 1730.

Provincial Grand Masters at Boston
On 30 April 1733, Henry Price of Boston was appointed Provincial Grand Master "of New England" by the Viscount Montagu, Grand Master of the Moderns' Grand Lodge in London. Clearly, this appointment would not have included Pennsylvania, except for Price's repeated, but disputed, claims that the Grand Master had "ordered him to extend Freemasonry over all North America." Price held this office until December 1736, when he was succeeded by Robert Tomlinson, also of Boston, who held the office until his death in 1740. Tomlinson was succeeded by Thomas Oxnard, who was deputized Provincial Grand Master "for North America" on 23 Sept. 1743. He remained in office until his death in 1754. Whether Price's office gave him jurisdiction over Pennsylvania Masonry has always been disputed, but the question, according to those who favor the supremacy of Massachusetts, became a moot point for a brief period with Oxnard's appointment over all of North America. Historians who argue in favor of Massachuestts' primacy over Pennsylvania also point to an appointment of Benjamin Franklin as Provincial Grand Master for Pennsylvania on 10 July 1749. They argue that Provincial Grand Masters had no authority to appoint other Provincial Grand Masters and Franklin's appointment was void since only grand lodges had authority to do so. However, Daniel Coxe's deputation from the Grand Lodge of England did in fact provide the Freemasons in Pennsylvania to elect a Provincial Grand Master every two years in perpetuity. Because of this we can assume that all successive Provincial Grand Masters of Pennsylvania were elected under the authority of this deputation.

The Demise of the Moderns in Pennsylvania
The Freemasonry of the Moderns Grand Lodge and its daughter lodges in Pennsylvania was eclipsed during the latter half of the 18th century by the rise of the Ancients Grand Lodge and its subordinate lodges. The American Revolutionary War took a great toll on Pennsylvania Freemasonry, and especially the Moderns' lodges. Beginning before the War some of the Modern Lodges had switched allegiance to the Ancients, e.g. Lodge No. 4 of the Moderns. By the end of the Revolution nearly all the lodges in Pennsylvania owed allegiance to the Ancients. It is impossible to determine precisely when the Moderns' Provincial Grand Lodge folded, but it was gone by 1785. The Masonic Hall, built by the Moderns in 1755 was sold, and the proceeds were placed in a charitable trust and became the "Freemason's Fuel Fund." Thus, we can say that the "Modern" line was grafted onto the "Ancient."

The Rise of the Ancients
The Ancient Provincial Grand Lodge of Pennsylvania:  On 15 July 1761, the Ancient Grand Lodge of England issued a warrant for a Provincial Grand Lodge of Pennsylvania, which appeared as Lodge No. 89 on the Grand Lodge roster. Three years before, the Ancient Grand Lodge had issued a warrant for Lodge No. 69 to a lodge in Philadelphia (later Lodge No. 2 of the Grand Lodge of Pennsylvania), which had been the first warrant issued to a lodge in North America by that Grand Lodge. As noted above, in a process that began before the Revolutionary War, some Modern Lodges had defected to and were absorbed by the Ancient Provincial Grand Lodge thus making the Ancients the dominant form of Freemasonry in Pennsylvania.

The Independent Grand Lodge is Formed

By 1785, Pennsylvania Freemasonry was entirely Ancient, the Moderns having been fully absorbed into the Ancient Provincial Grand Lodge of Pennsylvania. On 25 September 1786, the Ancient Provincial Grand Lodge of Pennsylvania declared itself to be independent of the mother Grand Lodge and closed itself permanently as a provincial grand lodge. The following day, 26 September, the representatives of 13 Ancient lodges met together and reformed the independent Grand Lodge of Pennsylvania, headquartered in Philadelphia. Though Pennsylvania Masonic ritual is entirely from the Ancients, and not an amalgamation of the two rituals, the Moderns did not simply cease to exist but were rather absorbed into Ancient Masonry and made to conform to their customs and usages. 

Since its inception, the Grand Lodge of Pennsylvania has moved its headquarters from building to building over the last two centuries, and on one occasion even conducted their meetings in Independence Hall.  

The first permanent Grand Lodge building was built on Chestnut Street in 1809, in the gothic revivalist style. However it burned down in 1819. A second grand lodge building was constructed in the 1850s, and was sold in 1873, upon completion of the current Masonic Temple in Philadelphia. This building has been the home of the Grand Lodge of Pennsylvania ever since.

Charitable Endeavors
The Grand Lodge of Pennsylvania (and its subordinate Lodges) support five charitable entities that offer a range of services.

The Masonic Temple, Library, and Museum
The headquarters of the Grand Lodge is in the Masonic Temple at One North Broad Street, directly across from Philadelphia City Hall. Built in 1873, it is a national historic landmark renowned for its beauty, architectural mastery and historical significance. The Library contains one of the finest collections for the study of American history and Freemasonry, and the Museum displays more than 30,000 treasured artifacts.

The Masonic Villages of Pennsylvania
Since its founding in 1894, the Masonic Home of the Grand Lodge of Pennsylvania, now known as the Masonic Villages of Pennsylvania 
 has grown and expanded.
The 1400 acres of the Masonic Village at Elizabethtown Campus began as a working farm where the Residents participated in farming chores. Today the farming aspects have been reduced to a prize winning stable of Bulls and a wonderful apple, peach, and cherry orchard. The Elizabethtown campus offers charitable services ranging from a children's home and child care center, to 445 beds of Nursing Home services and 971 units of Retirement living consisting of apartments and cottages.

Comprising five continuing care retirement communities across Pennsylvania providing a wide range of care and services, the Masonic Villages
are committed to caring for residents regardless of their sex, race, creed, Masonic affiliation or ability to pay. The communities extend quality healthcare and outreach services to numerous others through home and community-based services.

The Masonic Children's Home
The Masonic Children's Home is a home for children who come from various socio-economic environments that do not provide the security and support necessary for healthy growth and development. The youth receive food, clothing, complete medical care, academic tutoring and opportunities to participate in worship and extracurricular activities of their choosing.

The Pennsylvania Masonic Youth Foundation
The Foundation offers leadership, education and mentoring programs and resources for youth throughout the Commonwealth, and provides numerous resources and opportunities for Masonic youth groups. It supports initiatives to keep children safe from violence, abuse and exploitation, and provides specialized training for adults who provide leadership to young people.

The Masonic Charities Fund
This special fund supports operations and equipment purchases for The Masonic Library and Museum of Pennsylvania, as well as the restoration and preservation of the Masonic Temple. As needs present themselves, the fund supports scholarships and disaster relief across the globe, to Masonic or non-Masonic recipients.

Grand Masters

The current Grand Master is Jeffery Wonderling. In Pennsylvania, the Grand Master serves a two-year term. Notably, the regalia of the Grand Master of Pennsylvania is unlike that of any other Masonic Jurisdiction in the United States. The collar is made of velvet and contains no metal save for the bullion thread used to compose the stars. The apron is rounded, both at the base and on the flap, and has no excess ornamentation or fringe.
The following men have been Grand Masters.

1730–1731: Daniel Coxe
1731–1732: William Allen
1732: Daniel Coxe
1733: Humphrey Murray
1734: Benjamin Franklin
1735: James Hamilton
1736: Thomas Hopkinson
1737: William Plumstead
1738: Joseph Shippen
1741: Philip Syng
1747–1748: William Allen
1749: Benjamin Franklin
1750–1761: William Allen
1761: William Ball
1764–1765: William Ball
1767–1772: William Ball
1776–1782: William Ball
1783–1788: William Adcock
1789–1794: Jonathan B. Smith
1795: William Ball
1796–1797: William M. Smith
1798–1802: Jonathan B. Smith
1803–1805: Israel Israel
1806–1813: James Milnor
1814: Richard C. Taybout
1815: Samuel F. Bradford
1816–1817: Walter Kerr
1818–1821: Bayse Newcomb
1822–1823: Josiah Randall
1824: John B. Gibson
1825: James Harper
1826–1828: Thomas Kittera
1829–1830: Samuel Badger
1831–1832: Michael Nisbet, Sr.
1833–1834: John Steele
1835: George M. Dallas
1836: Tristram B. Freeman
1837–1838: John M. Read
1839–1840: Samuel H. Perkins
1841–1842: Joseph R. Chandler
1843: Cornelius Stevenson
1844–1845: William Barger
1846–1847: James Page
1848–1849: Peter Fritz
1850–1851: William Whitney
1852–1853: Anthony Bournonville
1854–1855: James Hutchinson
1856–1857: Peter Williamson
1858: John K. Mitchell
1859–1860: Henry M. Phillips
1861–1862: John Thomson
1863–1864: David C. Skerett
1865–1866: Lucius H. Scott
1867: John L. Goddard
1868–1869: Richard Vaux
1870–1871: Robert A. Lamberton
1872–1873: Samuel C. Perkins
1874–1875: Alfred R. Potter
1876–1877: Robert Clark
1878: James M. Porter
1879–1880: Michael Nisbit, Jr.
1881–1882: Samuel B. Dick
1883–1884: Conrad B. Day
1885–1886: E. Coppée Mitchell
1887–1888: Joseph Eichbaum
1889–1890: Clifford P. MacCalla
1891–1892: J. Simpson Africa
1893–1894: Michael Arnold
1895–1896: Matthias H. Henderson
1897–1898: William J. Kelly
1899: Henry W. Williams
1900–1901: George E. Wagner
1902–1903: Edgar A. Tennis
1904–1905: James W. Brown
1906–1907: George W. Kendrick, Jr.
1908–1909: George B. Orlady
1910–1911: George W. Guthrie
1912–1913: William L. Gorgas
1914–1915: J. Henry Williams
1916–1917: Louis A. Watres
1918–1919: James B. Krause
1920–1921: John S. Snell
1922–1923: Abraham M. Beitler
1924–1925: Samuel M. Goodyear
1926–1927: William M. Hamilton
1928–1929: J. Willison Smith
1930–1931: William S. Snyder
1932–1933: Benjamin Page
1934–1935: Otto R. Heiligman
1936–1937: Harold N. Rust
1938–1939: Robert R. Lewis
1940–1941: William H. Brehm
1942–1943: John A. Lathwood
1944–1945: Scott S. Leiby
1946–1947: Richard A. Kern
1948–1949: George H. Deike
1950–1951: William E. Yeager
1952–1953: Albert T. Eyler
1954–1955: Ralph M. Lehr
1956–1957: Charles H. Nitsch
1958–1959: Sanford M. Chilcote
1960–1961: Max F. Balcom
1962–1963: W. Leroy McKinley
1964–1965: Earl F. Herold
1966–1967: Robert E. Deyoe
1968–1969: John K. Young
1970–1971: Hiram P. Ball
1972–1973: W. Orville Kimmel
1974–1975: Rochester B. Woodall
1976–1977: John L. McCain
1978–1979: Walter P. Wells
1980–1981: Joseph E. Trate
1982–1983: Samuel C. Williamson
1984–1985: William A. Carpenter
1986–1987: Carl W. Sternberg, Jr.
1988–1989: Arthur J. Kurtz
1990–1991: W. Scott Stoner
1992–1993: Edward H. Fowler, Jr.
1994–1995: George H. Hohenshildt
1996–1997: Edward O. Weisser
1998–1999: James L. Ernette
2000–2001: Robert L. D'luge, Jr.
2002–2003: Marvin A. Cunningham Sr.
2004–2005: William Slater, II
2006–2007: Ronald A. Aungst, Sr.
2008–2009: Stephen Gardner
2010–2011: Thomas K. Sturgeon
2012–2013: Jay W. Smith
2014–2015: Robert J. Bateman
2016–2017: Raymond T. Dietz
2018–2019: Stewart Eugene Herritt
2020–2021: Thomas Gamon, IV
2021-2022: Jeffrey Wonderling

See also
Grand Lodge Of Illinois
Masonic Lodge
List of famous Freemasons

References

External links

Grand Lodge of Pennsylvania

Pennsylvania
Freemasonry in the United States
1786 establishments in Pennsylvania